Delaware's 4th Senate district is one of 21 districts in the Delaware Senate. It has been represented by Democrat Laura Sturgeon since 2018, following her defeat of incumbent Republican Gregory Lavelle.

Geography
District 4 covers many of Wilmington's northwestern suburbs in New Castle County, including Hockessin, Greenville, Pike Creek, Talleyville, Granogue, Brandywine, Alapocas, Montchanin, Runnymeade, Delaware Heights, Rockland, Winterthur, Wooddale, and other unincorporated areas.

Like all districts in the state, the 4th Senate district is located entirely within Delaware's at-large congressional district. It overlaps with the 4th, 12th, 21st, and 22nd districts of the Delaware House of Representatives. The district borders Pennsylvania along the Twelve-Mile Circle.

Recent election results
Delaware Senators are elected to staggered four-year terms. Under normal circumstances, the 4th district holds elections in midterm years, except immediately after redistricting, when all seats are up for election regardless of usual cycle.

2018

2014

2012

Federal and statewide results in District 4

References 

4
New Castle County, Delaware